During the 1997–98 English football season, West Ham United F.C. competed in the FA Premier League (known as the FA Carling Premiership for sponsorship reasons).

Season summary
After last season's near miss with relegation, West Ham United looked more convincing than they had done for years during 1997–98. John Hartson matured into one of the best strikers in the Premiership, with his partner Paul Kitson also providing a steady supply of goals. Young centre-back Rio Ferdinand remained loyal to his employers despite endless speculation of a move to a bigger club.

West Ham finished 8th in the final table, just one place short of UEFA Cup qualification. Holding on to Hartson and Ferdinand gave Harry Redknapp's men an even more enhanced chance of achieving that goal next time round.

Final league table

Results summary

Results by matchday

Results
West Ham United's score comes first

Legend

FA Premier League

FA Cup

League Cup

Squad

 (captain)

Left club during season

Reserve squad

Transfers

In

Out

Transfers in:  £8,600,000
Transfers out:  £7,500,000
Total spending:  £1,100,000

Statistics

Starting 11
Considering starts in all competitions
Considering a 4-3-1-2 formation
 GK: #22,  Craig Forrest, 20
 RB: #2,  Tim Breacker, 24
 CB: #15,  Rio Ferdinand, 46
 CB: #19,  Ian Pearce, 39
 LB: #6,  David Unsworth, 41
 CM: #18,  Frank Lampard, 38
 CM: #11,  Steve Lomas, 42
 CM: #17,  Stan Lazaridis, 34
 AM: #29,  Eyal Berkovic, 45
 CF: #10,  John Hartson, 42
 CF: #24,  Samassi Abou, 16

Notes

References

West Ham United F.C. seasons
West Ham United
West Ham United
West Ham United